Salyut 2 (OPS-1) ( meaning Salute 2) was a Soviet space station which was launched in 1973 as part of the Salyut programme. It was the first Almaz military space station to fly. Within two weeks of its launch, the station had lost attitude control and depressurized, leaving it unusable. Its orbit decayed and it re-entered the atmosphere on 28 May 1973, without any crews having visited it.

Spacecraft

Salyut 2 was an Almaz military space station. 
It was designated part of the Salyut programme in order to conceal the existence of the two separate space station programmes.

A single aft-mounted docking port was intended for use by Soyuz spacecraft carrying cosmonauts to work aboard the station. Two solar arrays mounted at the aft end of the station near the docking port provided power to the station, generating a total of 3,120 watts of electricity. The station was equipped with 32 attitude control thrusters, as well as two RD-0225 engines, each capable of generating  of thrust, for orbital manoeuvres.

Launch
Salyut 2 was launched from Site 81/23 at the Baikonur Cosmodrome, atop a three-stage Proton-K rocket, serial number 283-01. The launch took place at 09:00:00 UTC on 3 April 1973, and successfully placed Salyut 2 into low Earth orbit. Upon reaching orbit, Salyut 2 was assigned the International Designator 1973-017A, whilst NORAD gave it the Satellite Catalog Number 06398. The third stage (8S812) of the Proton-K rocket entered orbit along with Salyut 2. On 4 April, it was catalogued in a  orbit, inclined at 51.4 degrees.

Failure
Three days after the launch of Salyut 2, the Proton's spent third stage exploded, due to pressure changes within the tanks. This explosion resulted in a cloud of debris, some of which followed a similar trajectory to the station. Ten days later this debris struck the station, damaging the hull and causing depressurization. Both solar panels were torn free, removing the ability of the station to generate power and control its attitude.

Three pieces of debris from the station were catalogued, and had decayed from orbit by 13 May. The remainder of the station reentered the atmosphere on 28 May 1973 over the Pacific Ocean.

An inquiry into the failure initially determined that a fuel line had burst, burning a hole in the station. The damage from the debris collision was only discovered later.

Fidel Castro tour

When First Secretary of the Communist Party of Cuba Fidel Castro was in the Soviet Union as part of a whirlwind tour in 1972, General Secretary of the СССР of the Soviet Union Leonid Brezhnev brought Fidel Castro to the Gagarin Cosmonaut Training Centre. 
Fidel Castro was photographed inside both the Soyuz docking trainer and the Salyut-2 (OPS-1/Almaz) military space station.

See also

Salyut
TKS spacecraft
Almaz
Mir
Skylab
International Space Station

References

1973 in the Soviet Union
1973 in spaceflight
Salyut program
Soviet military spacecraft
Spacecraft which reentered in 1973
Almaz program
Spacecraft launched in 1973